Volynets, also spelled Volynec, Wolyniec, and Wolynetz, is a surname referring to Volhynia.

People

Volynets
 Danylo Volynets (born 2002), Ukrainian footballer
 Irina Volynets (born 1978), Russian journalist and human rights activist
 Katie Volynets (born 2001), American tennis player
 Oleksandr Volynets (born 1974), Ukrainian swimmer
 Yevhen Volynets (born 1993), Ukrainian footballer

Other forms
 Bogdan Wolynetz, a character in American TV series Breaking Bad
 John Wolyniec (born 1977), American soccer coach

See also
 
 

Ukrainian-language surnames
Polish-language surnames